A criminal investigation department or crime investigation department is a branch of many police forces. It may refer to:

Criminal Investigation Department, UK agency
Criminal Investigation Department (Bangladesh)
Criminal Investigation Department (India)
 CID West Bengal
Criminal Investigation Department (Ireland)
Criminal Investigation Department (Singapore)
Criminal Investigation Department (Sri Lanka)
Criminal Investigation Department (Kenya)
Criminal Investigation Department (Mandatory Palestine)

See also
Criminal Investigation Division (disambiguation)
CID (disambiguation)
National Bureau of Investigation (disambiguation)
Cambala Investigation Agency, Indian television show

Criminal investigation